The IRT Ninth Avenue Line, often called the Ninth Avenue Elevated or Ninth Avenue El, was the first elevated railway in New York City. It opened on July 3, 1868 as the West Side and Yonkers Patent Railway, as an experimental single-track cable-powered elevated railway from Battery Place, at the south end of Manhattan Island, northward up Greenwich Street to Cortlandt Street. It ceased operation on June 11, 1940, after it was replaced by the IND Eighth Avenue Line which had opened in 1932.

The last section in use, over the Harlem River, was known as the Polo Grounds Shuttle, and closed on August 31, 1958. This portion used a now-removed swing bridge called the Putnam Bridge, and went through a still-extant tunnel with two partially underground stations.

History

West Side and Yonkers Patent Railway

On April 20, 1866, the West Side and Yonkers Patent Railway Company was formed by Charles T. Harvey and eventually was awarded the approval to begin construction of an elevated line operating on Greenwich Street, then Ninth Avenue from Battery Place to 30th Street. His company had been chartered with a subscribed capital of $100,000, to build a  elevated railroad from the southern extremity of the city northward its length and thence to the village of Yonkers.

Construction on the line began on July 1, 1867. The first column was erected on October 7, 1867 and was tested in December 1867. The  line was dubbed the "one-legged railroad," because the single track ran above the street on a single row of columns. The cable was a loop, driven by a stationary engine, that ran between the rails for propulsion of the cars, and then returned under the street. The equipment included three complete passenger cars; four vaults where the machinery was located; and patent rights.

The line opened for business on July 3, 1868 The State Commissioners who authorized the "experiment" declared it a success, and the Governor authorized its completion to Spuyten Duyvil. The name was later changed to the West Side and Yonkers Patent Elevated Railway Company. The original northern terminus was 29th Street, and the southern terminus was Dey Street. The line used multiple -long cable loops, driven by steam engines in cellars of buildings adjacent to the track. Each loop was started when a car neared it and stopped when it had passed. The cables were equipped with collars fastened firmly onto the moving cable, that the car connected to with "claws", unlike the "grips" of the San Francisco cable-car system. As the claws could not be "slipped" in any manner, the car was jerked each time it moved to the next cable.

The line had ongoing problems. The mechanics of grasping the cable were less than perfect. Maintaining the -long cable was a problem. Having it "return" under the street was a problem that was fixed by having it return at track level, but it still had to be directed off the track and into the building where the stationary engine sat. Legal problems were constant, largely at the instigation of those who wanted the franchise for themselves. The line finally shut down altogether and sat idle for a few months, and its assets were sold for $960 (about $15,000 in today's money) at a sheriff's auction on November 15, 1870. The purchasers of this deal were the bondholders, who subsequently reorganized the line as the Westside Patented Elevated Railway Company.

There were objections from "Boss" William M. Tweed and his allies, who were pushing for his viaduct scheme, and injunctions introduced by the horse-car companies which previously had no competition. On February 9, 1871, the transit commissioners granted permission for the elevated railway company to proceed with their plan to discard all previous equipment and replace it with steam locomotives. Repairs were made to strengthen the existing structure and steam operation began on April 20, 1871. In the summer of 1871, the company defaulted on three mortgages, and trustees were appointed by the bondholders to reorganize the railroad properties. In 1872, the property was bought at auction by the newly organized New York Elevated Railroad Company. Thus commenced the world's first successful elevated railway. Steam power was to be used on all subsequent lines until the advent of electrical operation in 1902.

Extension

On May 6, 1872, the Watts Street station opened, and on June 17, 1872, the Little West 12th Street station opened with a passing track. On August 15, 1872 the Morris Street station was opened. On March 19, 1873, the Morris Street station was closed in favor of a terminal at the rear of 7 Broadway, where the company offices were located. US mail was carried on regular passenger trains on the front platform of the first car accompanied by a US Post Office guard with a limit of 7 bags. Railway Postal Office cars were not used for this service. The first yard and engine repair shop was located here. On January 21, 1873, the Franklin Street station opened. At the time, running time on the line was 28 minutes. On July 30, 1873, the line was extended to 34th Street on Ninth Avenue. On October 21, 1873, the 21st Street station opened. On November 3, 1873, the Houston Street station opened. On December 13, 1873, a new station opened at 30th Street, which replaced the original terminal at 29th Street. On May 25, 1874, a new and larger Cortlandt Street station replaced the original Dey Street station.

The line was closed down a short time while 200 men changed the wheel sets on the trucks of the rolling stock and relaid (moved) the rails on cross-ties. A passing siding at Franklin Street was also installed. On November 5, 1875, service was extended to 42nd Street at Ninth Avenue, and the Bethune Street station at Greenwich Street was opened. On January 18, 1876, single-track operation was extended to 61st Street, with stations at 50th Street and 55th Street and an incline was installed at 61st Street for equipment delivery. The line was then  in length. On April 15, 1877, the first double-track el structure from Morris Street through Battery Park to the South Ferry Terminal station at Whitehall Street was opened.

The Morris Street station was reopened for two years until the line was rebuilt for the junction of the IRT Sixth Avenue Line at Morris Street. On June 2, 1878, service to 53rd Street began. By then, the line carried 8,500 passengers a day. The car and engine shops were located behind 7 Broadway. Passenger cars were lighted by oil candles at this time. On June 9, 1879, operations were extended to 81st Street and Columbus (Ninth) Avenue, with new stations at 59th, 66th, 72nd and 81st Streets. The double track structure was built jointly by the New York Elevated Railroad on the west side of the street and the Metropolitan Elevated Railroad on the east side. On June 21, 1879, service was extended to 104th Street with intermediate stations at 86th, 93rd Street, and 99th Street.

On September 17, 1879, the line was extended further north from 104th Street and Columbus Avenue, curved east at 110th Street, and then turned north onto Eighth Avenue to 125th Street. A new station at 116th Street, above Eighth Avenue, was opened. It was dubbed "Suicide Curve" as some people leaped to their death from this location. In October 1879, the rebuilding of the lower portion of the line from 14th Street to Morris Street began. The Little West 12th Street station was probably closed at this time. The Morris Street station was closed again as the structure there was rebuilt for the junction to the IRT Sixth Avenue line. The Ninth Ave line narrowed to two tracks and the two tracks of the IRT Sixth Avenue Line on Trinity Place curved onto Greenwich Street to make a four-track structure, where the Sixth Avenue El ramped two blocks south to the level junction just north of the Battery Place Station. On September 27, 1879, the 130th and 135th Street stations on Eighth Avenue were opened.

On December 1, 1879, the 145th Street and 155th Street stations were opened. A yard was built on the east side of Eighth Avenue at 145th Street. On May 2, 1880, work was completed on the lower portion of the line and trains began operating over a completely rebuilt structure. The original track on the east side of Greenwich Street and the west side of Ninth Avenue, as well as the sections reinforced between 1874 and 1876, were torn down section by section and replaced. During this reconstruction, service was maintained by using the passing sidings, which, in some cases, became center passing tracks. The Battery Place station replaced the Morris Street station at the junction with the Sixth Avenue line. In the 1880s and the early 1890s, the Ninth Ave El was closed from 8 PM to 5:30 AM and all day on Sundays. In 1880, the fare was raised to 10 cents, but 5 cents during morning and evening rush hours. In 1885, the first demonstration of an electric traction engine in New York was on the Ninth Avenue El. In 1886, the fare was cut to 5 cents all the time and it stayed at 5 cents until 1939. In the earliest years, tickets were sold at stations and collected on the trains by conductors. After 1886, the tickets were dropped in collecting boxes.

In 1892, a third track was added from 59th Street to 116th Street.

On April 11, 1897, bicycle train service was inaugurated and operated each Sunday on the line from Rector Street to 155th Street. The South Ferry platforms were too congested to handle the service. Seats were removed on one side of cars and bicycle racks installed for 24" bikes. The fare was 15 cents for passenger and bike or 25 cents for two with a tandem. Thirty-five two car bicycle trains identified by signs on the front of the trains were run until the autumn, when they were discontinued permanently.

Electric operation
On February 18, 1903, electric operation began on the line from South Ferry to 155th Street. A 66th Street Local-Express powered by Locomotive #135 was the last steam operated passenger train on the line. A few steam locomotives remained in work train service for a number of years afterwards. On June 3, 1903, the 110th Street station opened, with four elevators to get passengers up from the street to the downtown platform and the mezzanine level for uptown trains. The station had to be built with elevators because it was 63 feet above street level, and was the highest station on the line. Some say that the tower which held the elevators lasted into the early 1970s.

The Interborough Rapid Transit Company took over operation of the Ninth Avenue El and several other lines of the Manhattan Railway Company with a 99-year lease on April 1, 1903. On April 1, 1903, the entire Manhattan Elevated system was leased to the IRT Company for 999 years. Subway system construction was planned to connect with the els at various points. By June 25, 1903, the last steam-powered elevated train was operated in passenger service on the 9th Avenue El. In 1905, the storage yard built at 145th Street was replaced with 159th Street Yard and service facility which was north of the Polo Grounds. The rebuilding project was extended north to 116th Street and created Manhattan's first three-track elevated, although center-track express service did not begin until 1916.

On September 15, 1904, the US Express Company began less-than-carload and package express service over the Third and Ninth Avenue Els. The express depot was at the rear of 7 Broadway, where the company offices were. A spur from the end of the Sixth Avenue El at Morris Street went into the upper level of the building. Livestock and less-than-carload freight were carried in the el's baggage-express center door cars. The package express cars made five round trips daily to uptown points at the 129th Street and 155th Street Terminals. Both services were discontinued shortly before World War I. No interchange railroad freight cars were operated. On September 11, 1905, the worst accident in the history of New York's elevated railways took place at a curve at 53rd street resulting in 13 deaths and 48 serious injuries.

On January 16, 1917, the installation of a third track was completed.

On November 15, 1917, the last new station was opened at 151st Street on Eighth Ave, where the structure was expanded to four tracks, and an express fly-over was installed to optimize traffic to the Bronx and 155th Street terminal operations.

On January 6, 1918, the New York & Putnam Railroad terminated its operations over the bridge to the 155th Street terminal with the Ninth Avenue El. The bridge and structure at the Polo Grounds was to have been the entrance of the New York & Northern Railroad, which later became the New York & Putnam, via the elevated structure into downtown and lower Manhattan. The Putnam Railroad Bridge was the last of the steam-powered swing type Harlem River drawbridges and was leased to the IRT for 999 years to become part of the IRT Ninth Avenue El, Jerome Avenue line extension to the Bronx.

On July 1, 1918, express service on the line began operating from 125th Street to 155th Street, and trains began using the new express station at 145th Street for the first time. At the same time, the line was extended to 162nd Street and stations opened at Sedgwick Avenue and Anderson–Jerome Avenues, in order to serve the New York Central Putnam Line passengers transferring to the new terminal at 30th Street. A rise in the Bronx terrain between the Sedgwick Avenue station to the east and the Anderson Avenue station to the west necessitated the Jerome Avenue connection to be tunneled for about five blocks, making that segment of the el a subway. The Sedgwick Avenue station entrance was above the el structure and serviced both the el and the new Putnam Railroad terminal built there to replace the 155th Street terminal.

Beginning on July 17, 1918, service was extended to the Kingsbridge Road station on the Jerome Avenue Line. On January 2, 1919, rush hour express trains began running to the Woodlawn station on the IRT Jerome Avenue Line.

On December 11, 1921, Lexington Avenue–Jerome Avenue subway trains began running north of 167th Street at all times, replacing elevated trains, which ran to Woodlawn during rush hours, but terminated at 167th Street during non-rush hours.

Starting in 1923 there were coin-operated turnstiles.

Final years

The line began at South Ferry and ran along Greenwich Street from Battery Place to Gansevoort Street in lower Manhattan, Ninth Avenue in midtown (joining with the Sixth Avenue El at 53rd Street, continuing along Columbus Avenue in upper Manhattan between 59th Street and 110th, turning east on 110th and running north on Eighth Avenue (Central Park West and Frederick Douglass Boulevard) until the Harlem River.

As of 1934, the following services were being operated:
 9th Avenue Local — South Ferry to 155th Street all hours, extended Sundays and late nights to Burnside Avenue via Jerome Avenue Line.
 9th Avenue Express — Rector Street to Burnside Avenue via Jerome Avenue Line weekdays and Saturdays daytime, extended to Fordham Road weekday rush periods, also Saturday morning rush and afternoon thru PM peak. These trains ran express south of 155th Street southbound until noon and northbound after noon, and made all stops in the opposite direction.

After the 6th Avenue Elevated was closed on December 4, 1938, weekday and Saturday evening 9th Avenue locals were extended from 155th Street to Burnside Avenue to replace 6th Avenue Elevated service.

Polo Grounds Shuttle 

The line was closed June 11, 1940 and dismantled, following the purchase of the IRT by the City of New York. Service from 155th Street to Burnside Avenue in the Bronx was continued as the "Polo Grounds Shuttle," or the 155th Street Shuttle, at all hours. A paper transfer issuance was established between the shuttle and the IND Concourse Line station at 155th Street at the Polo Grounds. IRT composite construction subway cars replaced the wooden elevated cars on the line, but retained the elevated third rail shoes. Dual third rail operation remained in use on the Jerome Avenue Line to the yards at Bedford Park until shuttle service ended in 1958, and the structure and the bridge were removed in 1962. The northern terminal of the shuttle was cut back to 167th Street on June 1, 1941. 

Service ended on August 31, 1958 as a result of the departure of the New York Giants baseball team (who had relocated to San Francisco), and the ending of passenger service on the New York Central's Putnam Division.

Station listing
From north to south, the stations were:

References

External links

 Beach Pneumatic Transit Co by Joseph Brennan Full of Photographs and information about the line, particularly Chapter 14.
 NYCsubway.org — The 9th Avenue Elevated
 1939 track map
 Time Traveling on the NYC Ninth Ave El — A History of New York City (Manhattan) Elevated Railways

9th Avenue
9th Avenue
Railway lines opened in 1868
Railway lines closed in 1940
Railway lines closed in 1958
1868 establishments in New York (state)
1940 disestablishments in New York (state)